Kola Escocesa which translates to "Scottish  cola" is a Peruvian soft drink. It is a brand of the Yura company, located in town of Yura, not far from the city of Arequipa. The beverage has been produced since the 1950s, using mineral water from the company's own water source. It is sold in PET bottles of 440ml, 600 ml, and 1.5 litres. Bottles come in both plastic and glass. Plastic is available in all sizes and the bottles take the former of a clear plastic bottle with a red label (see pictures). Glass bottles are a clear glass with writing directly on the bottle in a white color. Glass bottles are available in 600ml and 1.5L sizes. The soda can be hard to find outside of the city of Arequipa. The soda is also available in a light variant which has no sugar. Plastic bottles that are available in the light variant fade to white near the bottom of the red label. These bottles also have the word light on the label instead of clasica.

See also
Empresa Yura
Ginger Ale Aqp Dry
Agua Mineral Yura
Agua de Mesa Fontaine Bleu

References

External links
Kola Escocesa website 

Cola brands
Peruvian drinks